Duncan Currie (13 August 1892 – 1 July 1916) was a Scottish professional footballer who played as a full back in the Scottish League for Heart of Midlothian.

Personal life 
Currie's brothers Bob and Sam also became footballers. Currie served as a sergeant in McCrae's Battalion of the Royal Scots during the First World War and was killed on the first day of the Somme. He was shot in the right shoulder in no-man's land and died instantly during an assault on La Boisselle. Currie is commemorated on the Thiepval Memorial.

Honours 
Heart of Midlothian
 East of Scotland Shield: 1913–14
 Rosebery Charity Cup: 1913–14
 Wilson Cup: 1914–15
 North Eastern Cup: 1912–13

Career statistics

References

External links 

 

Scottish footballers
1916 deaths
British Army personnel of World War I
1892 births
Royal Scots soldiers
Scottish Football League players
Association football fullbacks
Kilwinning Rangers F.C. players
Heart of Midlothian F.C. players
McCrae's Battalion
Scottish military personnel
British military personnel killed in the Battle of the Somme